Soutter is a surname. Notable people with the surname include:

Ellie Soutter (2000–2018), British snowboarder
F. W. Soutter (1844–1932), British activist
James Soutter (1885–1966), British athlete
Julian Soutter (born 1994), South African cricketer
Lamar Soutter (1909–1996), American thoracic surgeon
Louis Soutter (1871–1942), Swiss engineer, architect, painter and musician
Lucy Soutter, British squash player
Michel Soutter (1932–1991), Swiss film director and screenwriter
 Nicholas Lamar Soutter, American writer and philosopher